Joe Tucker is a British comedy writer, director and animator known for directing and co-writing the award-winning short film For the Love of God. He has also directed a number of music videos for Hot Club de Paris and, together with Lloyd Woolf, created and wrote the Sky 1 television series Parents and the Comedy Central series Big Bad World.

Tucker has also written a number of sketches for CBBC series Horrible Histories.

References

British animators
British animated film directors
English screenwriters
English male screenwriters
Stop motion animators
People from Warrington
Living people
Year of birth missing (living people)